Tuscan Skies (Cieli di Toscana) is the third DVD released by Italian tenor Andrea Bocelli.

It contains music videos filmed in Tuscany of Bocelli singing 10 songs from his 2001 album, Cieli di Toscana, as a tribute to his home town and family.

Music videos

References

External links
 Tuscan Skies on Bocelli.de

Andrea Bocelli video albums
Music video compilation albums
2002 video albums
2002 compilation albums